Saint-Rémy-de-Provence (Provençal Occitan: Sant Romieg de Provença in classical and Sant Roumié de Prouvènço in Mistralian norms) is a commune in the Bouches-du-Rhône department, Provence-Alpes-Côte d'Azur, Southern France. Located in the northern part of the Alpilles, of which it is the main town, it had a population of 9,893 in 2017.

History
The town, which has been inhabited since Prehistory, was named after Saint Remigius under the Latin name Villa Sancti Remigii.

From May 1889 to May 1890, Vincent van Gogh was a patient at the Saint-Paul Asylum in Saint-Rémy-de-Provence, and painted some of his most memorable works, including The Starry Night, which features the town.

Geography

Transportation
The Avignon-TGV high-speed train station is 20 km from the city. The closest airports are located in Avignon, Nîmes, and Marseille. 
Also, there are several highways and main roads which serve Saint-Remy. The A54 autoroute runs from Nîmes to Salon-de-Provence, and passes through Arles, away.
Finally, the A9 is 20 km to the north-west and runs from Orange to Perpignan via Montpelier.

Climate
The climate in the Alpilles is considered Mediterranean. Winters there are gentle and dry, and summers are hot and dry. The highest average temperature is recorded in July and August , and the lowest in December and January  . The rainiest month is January with an average of 7 rainy days, compared with July, the driest month, with an average of 2 rainy days. The Alpilles region receives more precipitation than the French Rivera, 1–2 cm more per year. There are about 30 days of frost per year. Snow is rare, but can be heavy when it does fall.

Population

Sights
The ruins of the Roman city of Glanum, including a triumphal arch, can still be seen on the southern outskirts of the city.

The Saint-Paul Asylum in Saint-Rémy-de-Provence is where Vincent van Gogh was a patient, from May 1889 to May 1890, and where he painted some of his most memorable works, including The Starry Night which features the town. The site is now named the Clinique Van Gogh for him.

Notable people
 Pierre Daboval (1918–2015), artist, lived for many years in Saint-Rémy-de-Provence
 Marie Gasquet, a Provençale novelist and queen of the Felibrige
 Louis-Thomas Chabert de Joncaire, (1670–1739), French army officer and interpreter in New France
 Princess Caroline of Monaco and her children lived in Saint-Rémy for several years following the death of her second husband, Stefano Casiraghi
 Pablo Daniel Magee, writer, journalist and playwright grew up in Saint-Rémy de Provence
 Nostradamus, a 16th-century author of prophecies

See also
 Communes of the Bouches-du-Rhône department
 Domaine Henri Milan

References

External links

 Saint Rémy de Provence Tourist office website
 The Complete Works of Van Gogh, Saint-Rémy
 Official site (in French)
 Information and photos from ProvenceBeyond website

 
Communes of Bouches-du-Rhône
Bouches-du-Rhône communes articles needing translation from French Wikipedia